The Saudi Investment Bank (SAIB) (Arabic: البنك السعودي للاستثمار) was established as a Saudi joint stock, pursuant to Royal Decree No. M/31 of 25 Jumada al-Thani, 1396H (corresponding to June 23, 1976) in the Kingdom of Saudi Arabia. The bank started operations in March 1977.

The Saudi Investment Bank has a group of sister companies which are: American Express, Saudi Orix Leasing, and Amlak Global Finance and Real Estate Development. The bank operates through a 52 branch network as at the 2019, including 10 ladies branches distributed throughout the Kingdom of Saudi Arabia. The Saudi Investment Bank engaged in the financing of quasi-governmental and industrial sectors and trade finance that includes import and export activities. Through its (Asala) program the bank provides Sharia-compliant banking products and services.

See also 

 List of banks in Saudi Arabia

References

Banks of Saudi Arabia
1976 establishments in Saudi Arabia
Banks established in 1976